Rabbi Michel Twerski (born May 1939) is an American Hasidic rabbi and composer of Jewish music. He currently heads the Beth Jehudah congregation in Milwaukee. He is the brother of the psychiatrist Rabbi Abraham J. Twerski. Rabbi Twerski is a descendant of the Chernobyler Hasidic dynasty. He is also known as the Hornosteipler Rebbe of Milwaukee.

Family
Rabbi Michel Twerski is married to Rebbitzin Feige Twerski, a Jewish author and lecturer.

Rabbi Michel Twerski is a son of Grand Rebbe Jacob Israel Twerski (1898–1973) of Hornosteipel of Milwaukee, Wisconsin a scion of the Chernobyl Hasidic dynasty, and Dvorah Leah Twerski (1900–1995), daughter of Grand Rabbi Ben Zion Halberstam of Bobov. After his father's death, Rabbi Michel succeeded his father as Rebbe of Milwaukee.

Rabbi Michel Twerski is the brother of author, psychiatrist Rabbi Dr. Abraham J. Twerski of Israel, and the twin brother of Professor Aaron Twerski, the Irwin and Jill Cohen Professor of Law at Brooklyn Law School, as well as a former Dean at Hofstra University School of Law.

Children 
Baila Geldzahler, wife of the late Rabbi Eliezer Geldzahler, Rosh Yeshiva of Yeshiva Ohr Yisrael in Canarsie.
Cookie Spitz.
Chana Malka Singer, married to R' Dovid Singer.
Yocheved Weiss.
Benzion Twerski, assistant rabbi of Congregation Beth Jehudah.
Ephraim Twerski, Rabbi of Khal Chassidim in Chicago.
Chumie Ausch
Chagie Katz
HaRav Yaakov Moshe Twerski, rabbi in Monsey.
Mordechai Twerski, rabbi in London.
BatSheva

Tributes
Thomas M. Barrett of Wisconsin gave a tribute to Rabbi Twerski in the United States Congress. Rabbi Twerski was honored for his contribution to Jewish life and to the world of music.

The Milwaukee Symphony Orchestra conducted a tribute honoring Rabbi Twerski's musical contributions.

References

External links
 Website
Blog
 Video recordings

Living people
Religious leaders from Milwaukee
American Hasidic rabbis
Descendants of the Baal Shem Tov
1939 births